Below are the squads for the Football at the 1983 Mediterranean Games, hosted in Casablanca, Morocco, and took place between 9 and 17 September 1983.

Group A

Libya

Greece Ol.

Morocco
Coach:  José Faria

Group B

Egypt
Coach: Saleh El Wahsh

France B

Syria

Group C

Algeria
Coach: Hamid Zouba

Tunisia
Coach:  Ryszard Kulesza

Turkey B
Coach:

References

1983
Sports at the 1983 Mediterranean Games